Los medio hogares is a Mexican telenovela directed by Antulio Jiménez Pons for Telesistema Mexicano in 1966.

Cast 
Carmen Montejo
Alejandro Ciangherotti
Irma Lozano
Raúl Meraz
Pilar Sen

References

External links 

Mexican telenovelas
1966 telenovelas
Televisa telenovelas
Spanish-language telenovelas
1966 Mexican television series debuts
1966 Mexican television series endings